Arthur Edmund Carewe (December 30, 1884 – April 22, 1937), born Hovsep Hovsepian, was an Armenian-American stage and film actor of the silent and early sound film era.

Early life
He was born on December 30, 1884 to a prosperous Armenian family in Trabzon (Trebizond), Ottoman Empire (present-day Turkey).  His father, Garo, was engaged in the banking business and carried some influence from his positions in the national legislature and board of education. His father died in 1892, and the Hamidian massacres forced the Hovsepian family to emigrate. Carewe emigrated to the United States on August 7, 1896, arriving in New York Harbor on the Augusta Victoria, having departed from Cherbourg. He was accompanied by his elder brother, Ardasches. Another elder brother, Garo Armen, had preceded them, and their mother arrived the following year.

He attended Cushing Academy in Ashburnham, Massachusetts, after which he studied painting and sculpture. At the turn of the century, he and his elder brother Garo ran a rug and furnishings business in New York City. He decided upon a stage career and attended the American Academy of Dramatic Arts in New York City, graduating in March 1904 with the David Belasco Gold Medal for Dramatic Ability.

Career

By 1910, he had assumed the stage name of "Arthur Carew" and earned attention in national newspapers under the name Joseph Hosepian for a suspected fake suicide attempt over the actress/dancer Nance Gwynne. He relocated to Chicago sometime before 1915 and operated another furnishing goods business until he moved to Hollywood in 1919. His debut role was in the Constance Talmadge comedy Romance and Arabella. He became a naturalized citizen June 28, 1918.

During his time in the motion picture industry, Carewe became a well-respected character actor and would perform in several classic literary screen adaptations, including The Phantom of the Opera (1925), The Cat and the Canary and Uncle Tom's Cabin (1927), specializing as shady, neurotic, wild-eyed characters, which he seemed to revel in playing. He also continued to perform sporadically in regional theaters, essaying in 1921 the role of Prinzivalle in Monna Vanna by Maurice Maeterlinck. In 1926, he wrote two screenplays for First National that were never produced. In 1928, he traveled to Europe, but a proposal to perform a self-penned screenplay for Universum Film AG was never realized.

He was for a time considered for, and later turned down, the role of Count Dracula in the 1931 film, which would eventually go to Bela Lugosi. Carewe appeared in fifty films over the course of his career, mostly during the silent film era.

Personal life
Carewe married the soprano Irene Pavloska (née Irene Levi) on February 17, 1915, in Chicago. They divorced in 1921.

Later years and death
Shortly after the release of his final film, Charlie Chan's Secret, in 1936, Carewe suffered a stroke. On April 22, 1937, he was found dead in his car in the parking lot of a Santa Monica beach motel, apparently from a self-inflicted gunshot wound to the head.

Filmography

References

External links

 

1884 births
1937 deaths
20th-century American male actors
American Academy of Dramatic Arts alumni
American male film actors
American male silent film actors
American male stage actors
Armenian male actors
People from Trabzon
American people of Armenian descent
Armenians from the Ottoman Empire
Emigrants from the Ottoman Empire to the United States
Survivors of the Hamidian massacres
Suicides by firearm in California
1937 suicides